The Great Happiness Space: Tale of an Osaka Love Thief is a 2006 documentary film by Jake Clennell, describing a host club in Osaka. The male hosts and their female customers are interviewed, and through the interviews, we learn about the nature of host clubs and why the customers are coming there.

Awards
 Edinburgh International Film Festival 2006 - Best Documentary Feature Award
 FP Gotham Award 2006 Nomination - Best Film Not Playing at a Theatre Near You
 The British Independent Film Awards 2006 - Best British Documentary Nomination
 IDA Award 2006 Nomination - Best Documentary Feature
 Raindance Film Festival 2006 - Best Documentary Award Nomination

External links
 

Anime News Network review

British documentary films
2006 films
2000s Japanese-language films
Documentary films about Japan
2006 documentary films
Documentary films about sexuality
Films shot in Osaka
Sexuality in Japan
Films set in Osaka
2000s British films